Odd-Willy Martinsen (born 20 December 1942) is a retired Norwegian cross-country skier who competed during the 1960s and 1970s. He won three medals at the Winter Olympics, a gold in the 4 × 10 km relay  (1968) and silvers in the 30 km (1968) and the 4 × 10 km relay (1976). Martinsen won five medals at the FIS Nordic World Ski Championships, a gold in the 4 × 10 km relay (1966), a silver in the 15 km (1970), and bronzes in the 15 km (1966), 30 km (1970), and 4 × 10 km relay (1974). At the 1969 Holmenkollen ski festival, he won the 15 km race. For his cross-country skiing successes in Norway and abroad, Martinsen received the Holmenkollen medal in 1969. Thirty-two years later, his daughter, Bente Skari, received the Holmenkollen medal, making them the only father-daughter combination to ever win the prestigious honor.

Domestically Martinsen won Norwegian titles in the 15 km (1966, 1970), 30 km (1969, 1971) and 4 × 10 km relay (1970, 1972–1975, 1978). After retiring from competitions he became a skiing official and headed the FIS cross-country committee in 1986–2002. At the 1994 Winter Olympics in Lillehammer, he served as chief of the cross-country skiing competitions. He also founded the ski firm Finor AS, which was later run by his daughter and son.

Cross-country skiing results
All results are sourced from the International Ski Federation (FIS).

Olympic Games
 3 medals – (1 gold, 2 silver)

World Championships
 5 medals – (1 gold, 1 silver, 3 bronze)

References

External links

 
 Holmenkollen medalists – click Holmenkollmedaljen for downloadable pdf file 
 Holmenkollen winners since 1892 – click Vinnere for downloadable pdf file 
 Lillehammer 1994 Book 4 results – cross-country skiing section

1942 births
Living people
Holmenkollen medalists
Holmenkollen Ski Festival winners
Norwegian male cross-country skiers
Cross-country skiers at the 1968 Winter Olympics
Cross-country skiers at the 1976 Winter Olympics
Olympic gold medalists for Norway
Olympic silver medalists for Norway
Olympic cross-country skiers of Norway
People from Nittedal
Olympic medalists in cross-country skiing
FIS Nordic World Ski Championships medalists in cross-country skiing
Medalists at the 1976 Winter Olympics
Medalists at the 1968 Winter Olympics
Sportspeople from Viken (county)